Sympycnodes dunnorum is a species of moth of the family Cossidae. It is found in Australia, where it has been recorded from Western Australia, through South Australia to Victoria, the Australian Capital Territory, New South Wales and Queensland. The habitat consists of coastal woodland and dry forests.

The wingspan is 21–45 mm for males and 34–48 mm for females. The forewings are light fuscous brown in basal half with three dark brown spots surrounded by white scales. Adults have been recorded on wing from late November to early February.

Etymology
The species is named in honour of Professor Ashley and Mrs Jean Dunn.

References

Moths described in 2012
Zeuzerinae